Gardenhire is a surname.
 Erasmus Lee Gardenhire (1815–1899), Civil War-era Tennessee politician
 George Gardenhire (1841–?), territorial Oklahoma politician
 Ron Gardenhire (born 1957), former Major League Baseball shortstop and manager
 Samuel Major Gardenhire (1855–1923), writer